The Terry Flanagan Award is given each year by the American Hockey Coaches Association (AHCA) to an assistant hockey coach.  The award is intended to recognize the coach's entire body of work, not just his performance in one season.  The first recipient was Terry Flanagan, an assistant coach at Bowling Green.

The award's recipients:

References

+
^
Bowling Green Falcons ice hockey
1997 establishments in the United States
Awards established in 1997